Lobdell may refer to:

Lobdell, an unincorporated community in West Baton Rouge Parish, Louisiana
Jared Lobdell (1937–2019), American author 
Joe Lobdell (born 1983), American football player
Scott Lobdell (born 1963), American comic book writer and screenwriter